McKees Creek is a stream in the U.S. state of Ohio. It is a tributary of Stony Creek.

McKees Creek was named for Col. McKee, an early agent to the Native Americans.

Location

Mouth: Confluence with Stony Creek in Logan County 
Origin: Logan County east of Bellefontaine

See also
List of rivers of Ohio

References

Rivers of Logan County, Ohio
Rivers of Ohio